Rapa incurva is a species of sea snail, a marine gastropod mollusk, in the family Muricidae, the murex snails or rock snails.

Distribution
This species occurs in Mascarene Basin.

References

incurva
Gastropods described in 1852